Saraswati Chaudhary Kumari (born 28 January 1997) is a Nepali cricketer who plays for the Nepali national women's team.

Career 
In November 2019, she was named in Nepal's squad for the women's tournament at the 2019 South Asian Games. She made her Women's Twenty20 International (WT20I) debut for Nepal, against the Maldives, on 2 December 2019 in the opening match of the tournament.

In October 2021, she was named in Nepal's side for the 2021 ICC Women's T20 World Cup Asia Qualifier tournament in the United Arab Emirates.

References

External links
 

Living people
1997 births
Nepalese women cricketers
Nepal women Twenty20 International cricketers
South Asian Games bronze medalists for Nepal
South Asian Games medalists in cricket